is a railway station in Itoigawa, Niigata, Japan, operated by West Japan Railway Company (JR West).

Lines
Hiraiwa Station is served by the Ōito Line and is 14.9 kilometers from the intermediate terminus of the line at Minami-Otari Station, and is 85.0 kilometers from the terminus of the line at Matsumoto Station.

Station layout
The station consists of one ground-level side platform serving a single bi-directional track, connected to the station building by a level crossing. The station is unattended.

History
Hiraiwa Station opened on 15 August 1957. With the privatization of Japanese National Railways (JNR) on 1 April 1987, the station came under the control of JR West.

Passenger statistics
In fiscal 2016, the station was used by an average of 5 passengers daily (boarding passengers only).

Surrounding area
Himekawa Onsen

See also
 List of railway stations in Japan

References

External links

 JR West station information 

Railway stations in Niigata Prefecture
Railway stations in Japan opened in 1957
Ōito Line
Stations of West Japan Railway Company
Itoigawa, Niigata